María del Rosario Green Macías (31 March 1941 – 25 November 2017) was a Mexican economist, diplomat and politician.

She served as Secretary of Foreign Affairs in the cabinet of Ernesto Zedillo (President of Mexico, 1994–2000). She was also the Secretary General of the Institutional Revolutionary Party (PRI) from 2005 to 2006, and a Senator for the 2006–2012 period.

Education
Rosario Green held a degree in International Affairs from the UNAM and a master's degree in economics from El Colegio de México and Columbia University where she did postgraduate research on Latin American studies. She was awarded two doctorates honoris causa in the United States. The first one in Humanistic Sciences at the College of New Rochelle (New York) and the second one in Law from Tufts University (Massachusetts).

Professional career

Green Macías has been a faculty member of UNAM, Colegio de México and the Universidad Iberoamericana and director of the Matías Romero Institute of Diplomatic Studies at the Secretariat of Foreign Affairs as well as president of Fundación Colosio. She was Ambassador to East Germany, executive secretary of the National Human Rights Commission, sub-secretary of Foreign Affairs, Assistant Secretary-General for Political Affairs and Special Adviser to the Secretary-General on Gender Issues at the United Nations, and senator for her party, the Institutional Revolutionary Party (PRI).

During the Zedillo administration, she served as the country's first female Secretary of Foreign Affairs (January 1998 to November 2000).   In 2000 she signed a joint declaration for cooperation in the war against drug-trafficking with Igor Ivanov, the head of Russian Foreign Affairs. She represented Zedillo at the ceremony of change of government of Macau when sovereignty changed from Portugal to the Chinese government. She was also involved in the negotiations for the Free Trade Agreement between Mexico and the European Union.

During the Vicente Fox administration, she served as Mexico's  ambassador to Argentina. On 30 September 2005, Green succeeded  Elba Esther Gordillo as general secretary of the PRI. In the general election of 2 July 2006, she was elected to the Senate as the number-one candidate on the PRI's PR list.
 
Rosario Green was the First Director (2005–2006) and Visiting Professor of the Kozmetsky Center for Excellence in Global Finance at St. Edward's University in Austin, Texas.

Publications
 Estado y banca transnacional en México
 Los mitos de Milton Friedman
 La deuda externa de México
 De la abundancia a la escasez de créditos
 Lecciones de Deuda Externa de México: 1983–1997

References

External links
 Profile on the site of the Secretariat of Foreign Affairs of Mexico.
 Mexican Embassy in Argentina
Biography at the OECD website.
The Kozmetsky Center for Excellence In Global Finance
St. Edward's University in Austin, TX

1941 births
2017 deaths
Green, Rosarion
National Autonomous University of Mexico alumni
Institutional Revolutionary Party politicians
Mexican economists
Green Rosario
Members of the Senate of the Republic (Mexico)
People from Mexico City
Mexican Secretaries of Foreign Affairs
Women members of the Senate of the Republic (Mexico)
Tufts University alumni
College of New Rochelle alumni
Ambassadors of Mexico to Argentina
Ambassadors of Mexico to East Germany
Mexican people of American descent
Female foreign ministers
21st-century Mexican politicians
21st-century Mexican women politicians
Women Secretaries of State of Mexico
Mexican women ambassadors
20th-century Mexican politicians
20th-century Mexican women politicians